The National Reserve Korps Fanfare (Dutch: "Fanfare Korps Nationale Reserve") is a Dutch military unit in the Royal Netherlands Army that serves as the unit band of the National Reserve Corps. The band's home base is at Bernhard Barracks in Amersfoort. It is one of four military bands in the Netherlands Armed Forces. The conductor of the FKNR is Captain Alfred Willering while the commander is Major Theo van Deelen.

The band was founded in 1986, initially as a drum corps. It was later expanded to become a drum band, after which it eventually became a brass band. A copper ensemble and a combo are also active within the band. On 15 July 1996, a Belgian Air Force C-130H CH-06 crashed at Eindhoven Airport in the Dutch city of Eindhoven after departing from Villafranca in Italy. The aircraft carryed 37 members of the FKNR along with two pilots, one engineer and one loadmaster. 32 band members died in the crash. The crash is today known as the Herculesramp (Hercules disaster). It provides musical support for ceremonial events of national importance involving the army reserve and the national government. he FKNR is also present at events such as Prinsjesdag, Veteranendag, Bevrijdingsdag, and Dag van de Strijdkrachten.

See also
 Grenadiers' and Rifles Guard Regiment
 Army Band Hannover

References

Military of the Netherlands
Dutch military bands
Military units and formations established in 1986
Musical groups established in 1986